Georges Cirgues Antoine Jaloustre (26 October 1875 – 6 January 1951) was a Minister of State for Monaco. He served between 1918 and 1919. He died on 6 January 1951 at the age of 75.

References

Ministers of State of Monaco
1875 births
1951 deaths